The Martin XB-16, company designation Model 145, was a projected heavy bomber designed in the United States during the 1930s.

Design and development
The XB-16  was designed to meet the United States Army Air Corps (USAAC) request for a bomber that could carry  of bombs .

The XB-16 (Model 145A) was to use four Allison V-1710 liquid-cooled reciprocating V-engines; contemporary American aircraft used air-cooled radial engines.

In 1935, Martin revised the XB-16 design as the Model 145B. This version had a wingspan 20% greater than that of the B-29 Superfortress, the first operational bomber that would fill the role intended for the XB-16.

The XB-16 was canceled for essentially the same reason that the Boeing XB-15 project was: it was not fast enough to meet the requirements set by the Army. Since both were canceled around the same time, Martin did not have time to produce an XB-16.

Specifications (Model 145A)

See also

References

External links

 USAF Museum description of XB-16
 Martin aircraft 146 specifications

Martin B-16
B-16